Donald William McEvoy (3 December 1928 – 9 October 2004) was a professional footballer, who played principally for Huddersfield Town, his home-town club, and Sheffield Wednesday and latterly for Lincoln City and Barrow, who were then in the Fourth Division. He later went on to manage Halifax Town, Barrow (twice), Grimsby Town and Southport.

After local league football he signed for Huddersfield as an amateur in 1945, turned professional in September 1947 and made his debut in the first team in October 1949. After a short spell at centre forward he became a formidable centre-half for the remainder of his career. He was in promoted sides at both Huddersfield and Sheffield and led Barrow to their only promotion in the Football League. He retired from playing after the 1961–62 season and from management in 1971. His sole representative honour was to play for the FA in a 3–1 win against the Army in November 1953.

There is a good summary of his career on the give me football website. Further details are in the references.

References 
Huddersfield Town: A Complete Record 1910–1990, Terry Frost, Breedon Books 1990
Huddersfield Town, 75 Years On. G.S. Binns, Huddersfield Town AFC, 1984
99 Years and Counting - Huddersfield Town Centenary History by A.Hodgson, G.&I. Thomas and J.Ward, Huddersfield Town AFC, 2007
Don McEvoy, Post War English & Scottish Football League A - Z Player's Transfer Database

1928 births
2004 deaths
People from Golcar
English footballers
English football managers
English Football League players
Association football defenders
Huddersfield Town A.F.C. players
Sheffield Wednesday F.C. players
Lincoln City F.C. players
Barrow A.F.C. players
Halifax Town A.F.C. managers
Barrow A.F.C. managers
Grimsby Town F.C. managers
Southport F.C. managers
Sportspeople from Yorkshire